Ruvan or Ravan may refer to:
 Ravan, Hamadan
 Ravan, Kermanshah
 Ruvan, Qazvin